Mary Catherine Rowsell (29 December 183915 June 1921) was an English novelist, author of children's fiction, and dramatist. Her education in Belgium and Germany resulted in books based on German folk tales, and on French historical personages. Most of her children's books were set around well-know historical events.

Early life
Rowsell was born on 29 December 1839 and baptised in St. Dionis Backchurch on 22 January 1840. Her father were Charles John Rowsell (28 March 180228 January 1882), an accountant who may have patented the Graphoscope 
and certainly patented improvements to it. Her mother was Sarah Lewis (c. 1807buried 18 August 1897), and her parents were married on 6 June 1829, in St. Nicholas, Brighton, Sussex, England. Her aunt Sarah Rowsell was married to the architect Sir Charles Barry and her uncle was the popular preacher Thomas James Rowsell.

Rowsell was educated at Queen's College, London in Harley Street, and later in Brussels and Bonn. This enabled here to write books based on German folk-tales and on persons in French history.

Work
Rowsell produced four types of works:
Book for children, largely based wither on folk tales or on historical subjects.
Adult novels
Plays
Shorter fiction

Rowsell's first book was published in her mid twenties. This was a collection of forty fairy tales translated from German. No author's name was given in the advertisements, but reviews gave the author as M. C. R. The initial edition of the book was well received, and another edition was issued for the Christmas Gift Book Market. In advertising the Christmas edition, the publisher's quoted the press reviews of the first edition:
A charmingly written little volume. The illustrations are very good.Spectator.
The tales are no less instructive than entertaining.Observer. 
A good book to put into the hands of young persons.Press.
Will be found amusing by young people.Dispatch.
A most capital series of fairy tales, illustrated by many well-executed engravings.Army and Navy Gazette. 
 The present collection of tales is the best we have seen.Sunday Times. 
Equals in interest the ' Arabian Nights.' Bayswater Chronicle.
To our young friends we commend the Spirit of the Giant Mountains." Illustrated News of the World.

Despite this initial success Rowsell had no further work published until Abbots' Crag in July 1872. On this occasion the author was identified as M. C. Rowsell.

List of longer works

The following list is based on searches on the Jisc Library Hub Discover, which collates the catalogues of 162 national, academic, and specialist libraries in the UK and Ireland. The online availability of texts is indicated for the following repositories:
BLThe British Library
IAThe Internet Archive
HTHathi Trust
FLBaldwin Library of Historical Children's Literature at the University of Florida

Serials and shorter works
Rowsell edited the short lived (one volume only) St. Paul's Magazine in 1889. This should not be confused with Saint Paul's, a monthly magazine edited by Anthony Trollope which ran for 14 volumes from 18671874. Rowsell contributed, with James Macdonald Oxley and John Alexander Hammerton to The Children's Friend: a magazine for boys and girls at home and school (London: S. W. Partridge) in 1902 and 1903.

Several of Rowell's published novels were serialised, but she also published shorter fiction and serial stories including:
The Secret of the Ivory Room, a longer short story. Appeared in the Adelaide Observer in 1906.
Uncle Will's Wager, a short story. Appeared in the Otago Witness, New Zealand in 1912.
The Heir of Willowcote: A serial story in which a baby is rescued from destruction by a midwife and spirited away from a country house. It appeared in the Ottawa Evening Journal, in the Leominster News, and others. A review of another Rowsell book in 1901 listed the story among the publication credits for Rowsell, suggesting it may have been published as a book.
Monksford Ferry, a longer short story. Appeared in multiple newspapers including the Sunday Citizen in Brooklyn, the Eastern Press in Norfolk in 1899, and in the Western Chronicle in 1905.
Paul Stormont's First Wife, a short story. Appeared in Norfolk News in 1900, and other outlets.

Later life
Rowsell had fallen on hard time by the end of the 19th century. The small annuity left her by her father, who died in 1882, and her mother, who dies in 1897, shrank due to bad investment choices. As a result, she appealed four times to the Royal Literary Fund. Rowsell died at 81 years of age on 15 June 1921. The cause of death was stated to be epilepsy and senile decay.

Notes

References

External links
Books by Rowsell at the Hathi Trust (access may very with location).
Online books by Rowsell at the British Library.
Books by Rowsell at the Internet Archive.
Books by Rowsell at the Baldwin Library of Historical Children's Literature in the University of Florida.

1839 births
1921 deaths
People educated at Queen's College, London
19th-century British women writers
19th-century English novelists
20th-century British women writers
20th-century English novelists
British women essayists
English essayists
Victorian novelists
Victorian women writers